Alles auf Anfang 2014–04 (Starting Over 2014–04) is the first compilation album by German band Silbermond. It was released on 27 November 2015 by Verschwende deine Zeit GmbH.

Track listing

Charts

Certifications and sales

Release history

References

External links
 Silbermond.de – official site

2014 albums
Silbermond albums